The 2000–01 NSW Premier League season was the inaugural season of the NSW Premier League. The competition replaced the NSW Super League as the top-tier competition in New South Wales. The season moved away from a winter league to a summer league to align with the then premier national competition, the National Soccer League. The second-tier competition became the NSW Winter Super League.

The competition began on Friday, 3 November 2000 at St George Stadium for the Round 1 fixture between St George Saints and Canterbury-Marrickville. The competition concluded with the grand final being played on Sunday, 8 April 2001 at Marconi Stadium, with Bonnyrigg White Eagles FC taking out the title by defeating Premiers Blacktown City FC 3–1.

Clubs

Regular season

League table

Results

Finals series

Semi-finals

Preliminary final

Grand final

See also
NSW Premier League
Football NSW

References

External links
NSW Premier League Official website

NSW Premier League Season, 2000–01
New South Wales Premier League seasons
NSW Premier League Season, 2000–01